Babak Pourgholami is an Iranian football player who plays for Aluminium in Azadegan League.

Club career

Club career statistics
Last updated: 30 April 2013

 Assist Goals

External links
Persian League Profile

Iranian footballers
1981 births
Living people
People from Bandar-e Anzali
Persian Gulf Pro League players
Fajr Sepasi players
Malavan players
Association football midfielders
Sportspeople from Gilan province